Champagne Pommery is a Champagne house located in Reims. The house was founded as Pommery & Greno in 1858 by Alexandre Louis Pommery and Narcisse Greno with the primary business being wool trading.  Under the guidance of Alexandre's widow, Louise Pommery, the firm was dedicated to Champagne production and soon became one of the region's largest Champagne brands. Champagne Pommery was the first house to commercialize a brut Champagne in 1874. 

It is possible to visit this Champagne cellar and also the Villa Demoiselle, just in front of Champagne Pommery House in Reims.  

Pommery is currently owned by the Vranken-Pommery Monopole Group (located in Reims), which also owns Heidsieck & Co Monopole and Vranken, Château la Gordonne, Domaine Royal de Jarras, and Rozès in their portfolio. 

In August 2022, Pommery announced a collaboration with Japanese rock star Yoshiki as the brand's first co-release with a celebrity artist.

See also
 List of Champagne houses

References

External links 
 
 http://www.chicagotribune.com/dining/recipes/sc-food-0417-giants-pommery-20150413-story.html

1858 establishments in France
Champagne producers
Buildings and structures in Reims